Novak Djokovic was the defending champion, but chose not to participate that year.

Philipp Petzschner won in the final 6–4, 6–4, against Gaël Monfils.

Seeds

Draw

Finals

Top half

Bottom half

External links
Draw
Qualifying draw

Singles